The 1922 Virginia Orange and Blue football team represented the University of Virginia as a member of the Southern Conference (SoCon) during the 1922 college football season. Led by Thomas J. Campbell in his first and only season as head coach, the Orange and Blue compiled an overall record of 4–4–1 with a mark of 1–1–1 in conference play, placing ninth in the SoCon.

Schedule

References

Virginia
Virginia Cavaliers football seasons
Virginia Orange and Blue football